Surface To Air is the second full-length album by space rock duo Zombi. It was released in the United States by Relapse Records on May 2, 2006. The first vinyl edition was released through Belgian record label Hypertension Records in 2006. The second vinyl edition was published by Norman Records in the United Kingdom in 2014.

Track list
All Songs Written & Arranged by Zombi.

Production
Produced by Zombi
Recorded, mixed and mastered by Steve Moore

Musicians
Steve Moore – bass, synthesizers, keyboards
A.E. Paterra – drums, percussion, synthesizers

References

2006 albums
Zombi (band) albums
Relapse Records albums
Hypertension Records albums